This article includes lists of all Paralympic medalists since 1960, organized by each Paralympic sport or discipline, and also by Paralympiad.



By sport

Summer Paralympic sports

Winter Paralympic sports

Past sports

Summer

Winter

By Paralympiad

Summer Paralympic Games

Winter Paralympic Games

See also
 List of multiple Paralympic gold medalists
 Lists of Olympic medalists
 List of sport awards

Notes

References
 
 The information from the International Paralympic Committee (IPC) website is based on sources which does not present all information from earlier Paralympic Games (1960–1984), such as relay and team members.

 
Paralympic Games medal tables
medalists